Jack Uwins (4 September 1913 – 16 February 1998) was  a former Australian rules footballer who played with Richmond in the Victorian Football League (VFL).

Notes

External links 
		

1913 births
1998 deaths
Australian rules footballers from Victoria (Australia)
Richmond Football Club players